Tagbo (Tagbu, Tagba) is a Ubangian language of Democratic Republic of the Congo.

References

Languages of the Democratic Republic of the Congo
Sere languages